Angeletti may refer to:

 Luigi Angeletti, Italian trade unionist and syndicalist
 Marco Angeletti, Italian footballer
 Pietro Angeletti, Italian painter in a Neoclassical style
 Crassispira angeletti, species of sea snail, a marine gastropod mollusk in the family of Turridae, the turrids